Ryan Gamble (born 23 September 1987) is a former professional Australian rules football player in the Australian Football League (AFL). Gamble played for the Geelong Football Club and the St Kilda Football Club.

Early life
Gamble played his junior football at the Mt Burr United Football Club, from the MSEFL in South Australia, and at the Glenelg Football Club in the SANFL from the age of 17, predominantly in the reserves, but gaining senior selection towards the end of the season. The Geelong Football Club drafted him with their third round selection in the 2005 AFL Draft.

Career
Gamble spent almost all of the 2006 season playing for the Geelong VFL team, rotating as a midfielder and forward, also noted as a prolific high-flyer. He gained senior AFL selection for the final game of 2006. He has shown a high skill level, and his light frame (78 kg) is the only thing likely to hinder him from gaining regular selection in the near future.

Gamble was unlucky not to gain selection at AFL level in 2007, after a pre-season injury in which he tore ligaments in his ankle. He was almost certain to get a few more games under his belt, but his injury prevented him being right for selection for the first half of the season, and Geelong's success in 2007 meant few changes were made to the team each week, causing Gamble, as well as several other young players to miss out on senior selection throughout the year.

2008 season
Gamble impressed in the pre-season after kicking 5 goals against a strong Port Adelaide side in an exhibition match in London. Many predicted he would make his senior breakthrough this year, provided he stay injury-free and he has managed to do so, being included in the Cats squad in round ones and two, kicking 4 goals as a small roving forward before succumbing once again to injury, but after a one-week absence he returned to the Cats lineup against St Kilda in round 4, however his single major wasn't enough to retain his place.

Since then he has made himself a very valuable squad member having played 4 games consecutively. His impressive form and 5 goals in a game in the VFL earned him a place amongst the reserves and when David Wojcinski pulled out at the last minute against the Western Bulldogs, Gamble filled the void impressively kicking 4 goals in the Cats 61 point win.
Gamble was a finalist in the 2008 Army Award, which recognises acts of courage, initiative and teamwork on the football field.

2011: St Kilda era

He was handed a lifeline in the 2010 draft, with the saints using their 4th round pick to secure Gamble after he was delisted by Geelong at the end of 2010. He played the first 3 games of 2011 before being dropped back to the VFL. He returned later in round 12 and impressed over the next few weeks before his standout game came in round 16 against the Power, kicking 4 goals and earning a brownlow vote for his efforts. His coach praised his defensive efforts and people suddenly believed that 'the gamble' had paid off. He was dropped several weeks later and never made it back into the side. New coach Scott Watters axed Gamble from the list after 11 games and 11 goals in Saints colours.

Statistics
 Statistics are correct as of round 19 of 2008 season

References

External links

 
 Geelong's 2005 Draft Selections
 Article on Gamble's Abilities
 

1987 births
Living people
Australian rules footballers from South Australia
Glenelg Football Club players
Geelong Football Club players
St Kilda Football Club players
People from Millicent, South Australia
Sandringham Football Club players